POA (meaning "grass" in Greek) is the first and only studio album by the Italian progressive rock band Blocco Mentale. It was released in 1973.

Track listing

 Capita (4:44) 
 Aria E Mele (4:34) 
 Impressione (8:27) 
 Io E Me (4:27) 
 La Nuova Forza (7:37) 
 Ritorno (5:34) 
 Verde (3:52)

Bonus on CD 
 L`amore Muore A Vent`Anni 
 Lei E Musica

Notes

1973 albums